Splaining can refer to:

 Explaining
 Mansplaining
 Whitesplaining